Old boys of the City of London School are called Old Citizens. The school's old boy association is called the John Carpenter Club after John Carpenter, town clerk of London, whose bequest led to the founding of the school.  This list is not comprehensive; over 140 people listed in the Oxford Dictionary of National Biography, which includes only people dead at the time of publication, were educated at the City of London School.

Notable Old Citizens

Many of those listed are cited in the Dictionary of National Biography.

Edwin Abbott Abbott – Headmaster of the school (after whom Abbot house is named), theologian and author
David Lindo Alexander – Jewish community leader
Joe Alwyn – actor
Kingsley Amis – Writer
William Anderson – Physician, Anatomy professor and scholar of Japanese Art
Michael Apted – Actor, Producer and Director
Thomas Walker Arnold – Orientalist
Lord Ashby – Botanist and university chancellor
H. H. Asquith – Prime Minister 1908–1916
Roy Baker - Film director
Hugh Lewis - Antique furniture Restorer
Julian Barnes - Novelist
Jonathan Barnes – Philosopher
Aaron Barschak – Comedian
Henry Charles Beeching – Poet
Samuel L Bensusan – author and expert on country matters
David Blundy – War Correspondent, killed in El Salvador, 17 November 1989
Bramwell Booth – General of the Salvation Army
Mike Brearley – Cricketer, captain of the England cricket team 1977–1981 and whose father Horace Brearley taught at CLS
Clive Brooks – member of the band Egg
Arthur Henry Bullen – Publisher and scholar
Kenneth Callow – Biochemist
Mont Campbell – Member of the band Egg
Suma Chakrabarti – Senior Civil Servant
Lord Chalmers – Colonial governor and minister
Sir Paul Chambers – Industrialist, Chairman of ICI
Danny Cohen – New Controller of BBC One, and formerly of BBC Three
Lord Collins – Supreme Court justice
MJ Cole – UK Garage DJ, record producer and remixer.
Robert Seymour Conway – Classical scholar and philologist
Jim Cousins – Labour MP
Jack Crawford – Professional NFL Player, Oakland Raiders
Philip Dawid – Statistician
John Diamond – Journalist and broadcaster, & Sunday Times writer
Edward Divers – Chemist
Lord Evans – Royal physician
Stewart Farrar – Author
Henry Charles Fehr – Sculptor
John Knight Fotheringham – Historian, an expert on ancient astronomy and chronology
Percy Gardner – Archaeologist
Edward Garnett – Editor and writer
Leo Genn – Stage and film actor
Roland Glasser – literary translator
Israel Gollancz – Founding member of the British Academy
Theodore Bayley Hardy – Victoria Cross holder
Sam Hield Hamer – editor and writer
Sir Nicholas John Hannen, Chief Justice of the British Supreme Court for China and Japan and British Consul General, Shanghai
Peter Higgs – Nobel Prize–winning theoretical physicist, predicted the so-called "God Particle" known as the Higgs boson
Frederick Hopkins – Nobel prize winning biochemist
Paul Hough – Film Director
William Huggins – Astronomer
Joseph Oscar Irwin – Statistician
Steven Isserlis – Cellist
Benedict Jacka – Novelist 
Tim Jackson – Entrepreneur and author
Anthony Julius – Lawyer
Skandar Keynes – Film Actor
Ralph Knott – Architect
Peter B. Kronheimer – Mathematician
James Leasor – Author
Sidney Lee – Editor of the Dictionary of National Biography
Anthony Lester – Lawyer
Peter Levene – Chairman of Lloyd's of London and Lord Mayor of London 1998 & 1999
Joseph Hiam Levy
David M. Lewis – Professor of Ancient History, University of Oxford
Sir Patrick Linstead – Chemist and Rector of Imperial College London
David Litman – American Entrepreneur, founder of hotels.com
Ernest Lough – Boy soprano, singer, whose recording of Mendelssohn's "O for the Wings of a Dove" with the Temple Choir in 1927 made him world-famous; it had sold one million copies by 1962, the first classical record to reach this figure.
Sir Wylie McKissock – neurosurgeon
Luke McShane – Chess Grandmaster
Lord Mishcon – Solicitor and politician who represented Princess Diana in her divorce. Home affairs spokesman in the House of Lords from 1983–1990 and shadow Lord Chancellor 1990–1992.
Neil Morisetti – UK Climate and Energy Security Envoy
Max Newman – mathematician and World War II codebreaker
George Newnes – publisher and editor
Denis Norden – Writer and broadcaster
Richard Packer – Senior Civil Servant
Robert William Paul pioneer of cinematography
Howard John Stredder Pearce – Former Governor of the Falkland Islands and Civil Commissioner of South Georgia and the South Sandwich Islands (SGSSI)
Mark Pears, British billionaire, CEO of William Pears Group
Sir William Henry Perkin FRS – Chemist best known for his discovery of the first aniline dye mauveine at the age of 18.
Henry Thomas Herbert Piaggio – Physicist
Arthur Rackham – Illustrator
Daniel Radcliffe – Actor in the Harry Potter series of film adaptations.
Gervais Rentoul – Politician and first chairman of the 1922 Committee
Charles Thomson Ritchie – Chancellor of the Exchequer 1902–1903
Joshua Rose – England Hockey Player and Comedian
Leon Roth – Jewish Philosopher and founder of the Department of Philosophy at Hebrew University 
Edward Linley Sambourne – Punch cartoonist
Michael Schwab – Professor of Public Health
John Robert Seeley – Historian and essayist
John Shrapnel – Film and stage actor
Bernard Silverman FRS- Former Master of St Peter's College, Oxford, and Chief Scientific Adviser to the Home Office
William Johnson Sollas, geologist and anthropologist
Colin Southgate – Businessman
Dave Stewart – Keyboardist with the bands Uriel, Egg, Hatfield and the North, National Health, Bruford and Stewart / Gaskin.
Edward Stanford – Mapmaker
Alfred Sutro – Playwright
Derek Taunt – Mathematician and cryptologist
Sir Thomas Taylor – Chemist, academic, and university administrator. 
John Lawrence Toole – Actor and theatre manager
Thomas Fisher Unwin – Publisher
David Walker – Master of the Household
Alan Arthur Wells – Structural engineer, developer of Wells turbine
Sir Robert Stanford Wood First Vice Chancellor of the University of Southampton

See also
 :Category:People educated at the City of London School

References

 
Citizens